

Events 
November 26 – Joseph Haydn marries Maria Anna Keller, but he and his wife will live apart for most of their lives.
John Newton leaves his job for the church, and begins composing hymns.
Memoirs of the Life of the Late George Frideric Handel, by John Mainwaring, is published anonymously.
John Alcock is forced to resign as organist and choirmaster of Lichfield Cathedral.
Johann Christian Bach becomes organist of Milan Cathedral.
John Garth publishes his Op. 1 cello concertos (written over the previous decade), the first time such compositions have been published in Britain.
Johann Baptist Wanhal is brought to Vienna to receive lessons from Carl Ditters von Dittersdorf.

Popular music

Opera 
Thomas Arne – Thomas and Sally
Johann Christian Bach – Artaserse
Johann Adolph Hasse – Alcide al Bivio
Vincenzo Manfredini – Semiramide
Niccolò Piccinni – La buona figliuola
Jean-Philippe Rameau – Les Paladins

Classical music 
Johann Albrechtsberger – String Quartet in D
Carl Philipp Emanuel Bach 
Fantasia and Fugue in C minor, H.75.5
Sechs Sonaten für Clavier mit veränderten Reprisen, Wq.50 (H. 126, 136–140) (published, Berlin; composed 1758–59)
William Boyce – Eight Symphonies, op. 2 (published, London: John Walsh; composed over the previous 21 years)
François Joseph Gossec – Grande Messe des Morts
Joseph Haydn 
Symphony No.25 in C major, Hob.I:25
Partita in B-flat major, Hob.XVI:2
Partita in E major, Hob.XVI:13 (attribution in question)
Michael Haydn – Concerto for Violin in B-flat major
Pierre Hugard – La Toilette, suites for the pardessus de viole
Ignacio de Jerusalem – Clarines sonad (misattributed)
Franz Xaver Richter 
6 Harpsichord Trios
6 Symphonies, Op. 2
 Christoph Schaffrath – Duetto for Bassoon and Harpsichord in F minor, CSWV F:18
 Georg Philipp Telemann – Lukas-Passion

Methods and theory writings 

 John Alcock, Sr. – The Life of Miss Fanny Brown
 Giorgio Antoniotto – L'arte armonica
 Francesco Geminiani – The Art of Playing the Guitar or Cittra
 John Mainwaring – Memoirs of the Life of the Late George Frederic Handel
 Friedrich Wilhelm Marpurg – Kritische Briefe über die Tonkunst
 Edward Miller – Institutes of Music, or Easy Instructions for the Harpsichord
 Nicolo Pasquali – The Art of Fingering the Harpsichord
 Jean-Philippe Rameau – Code de musique pratique
 Georg Andreas Sorge 
 Anleitung zum Generalbass und zur Composition
 Compendium Harmonicum
 William Tans'ur – The Psalm-Singer's Jewel

Births 
January 10 – Johan Rudolf Zumsteeg, German composer (died 1802)
January 19 – Melchor Lopez Jimenez, Spanish composer (died 1822)
January 30 – Franz Xaver Partsch, Bohemian composer (died 1822)
February 12 – Jan Ladislav Dussek, composer (died 1812)
February 15 – Jean-François Le Sueur, French composer (died 1837)
March 2 – Charlotta Cederström, born Christina Charlotta Mörner af Morlanda, Swedish patron of the arts (died 1832)
March 27 – Ishmail Spicer, American composer (died 1832)
April 4 – Juan Manuel Olivares, Venezuelan composer (died 1797)

May 10 – Claude Joseph Rouget de Lisle, French composer of La Marseillaise (died 1836)
May 29 – Charlotte Slottsberg, Swedish ballerina (died 1800)
July 11 – François-Benoît Hoffman, librettist and playwright (died 1828)
June 12 – Jean-Baptiste Louvet de Couvray, librettist and novelist (died 1797)
June 14 – Cándido José Ruano, Spanish composer (died 1803)
July 12 – Giuseppe Foppa, Italian librettist (died 1845)
September 12 – Gaetano Valeri, Paduan organist and composer (died 1822)
September 14 – Luigi Cherubini, Italian-born composer (died 1842)
September 29 – Maria Hester Park, British composer (died 1813)
October 1 – William Beckford, English novelist, patron of the arts and composer (died 1844)
November 9 – Henri-Philippe Gérard, Liègeois composer
November 14 – Johann Evangelist Brandl, composer (died 1837)
November 30 – Catharine Frydendahl, opera singer (d. 1831)
December 2 – Joseph Graetz, German composer (died 1826)

Deaths 
January 18 – Claudio Casciolini, Italian composer (born 1697)
February 14 – François Colin de Blamont, French composer (born 1690)
February 22 – Anna Magdalena Bach, German singer, second wife and assistant of Johann Sebastian Bach (born 1701)
March 2 – François Bouvard, French composer (born 1760)
March 14 – Anton Fils, German composer (born 1733)
April 12 – Ernst Gottlieb Baron, German lutenist and composer (born 1696)
April 24 – Michele Mascitti, music editor and violinist (born c. 1664)
May – Girolamo Abos, Italian composer (born 1715)
May 10 – Christoph Graupner, German composer (born 1683)

August 8 – Henry Needler, English music transcriber (born 1685)
October 24 – Giuseppe Maria Orlandini, Italian composer (born 1676)
November 5 – Pierre Février, French organist, harpsichordist and composer (born 1696)
Date unknown – Roque Ceruti, Italian composer (born c. 1683)

References

 
18th century in music
Music by year